Holly Davidson (born 26 April 1980 in London) is an English actress, model and personal trainer.

Davidson is most known for her recurring roles on the TV series' Renford Rejects, The Bill, and Casualty; and roles in the films Final Cut, Van Wilder: The Rise of Taj, and Essex Boys.

Davidson grew up in Shropshire from the age of 6 through to 16, and is the daughter of the photographer Robert Davidson and the sister of actresses Sadie Frost and Jade Davidson.

She married photographer Sebastian Roos on 21 June 2019 on a beach in Sweden.

Filmography

References

External links
 https://www.hollyactive.com 
 

1980 births
Living people
People  from Ludlow
English television actresses
English female models
Actors from Shropshire